PS Queen of the Bay was a passenger vessel operated by the  West Cornwall Steam Ship Company from 1873 to 1885

History

She was built by Henderson, Coulborn and Company in Renfrew and launched in 1867. She operated for the Blackpool, Lytham and Southport Steam Packet Company out of Morecambe for five years and then Blackpool for two years. She was sold to the West Cornwall Steam Ship Company in 1873 for £4,600 (equivalent to £ in ).

In 1885 she was sold for £2,250 (equivalent to £ in ) to the Bristol Channel and was operated by the Newport and Bristol Channel Excursion Company for four year. After a sale in 1889 to another Cardiff owner, she caught fire on the River Usk on 22 May 1894 and was sold for scrap.

References

1867 ships
Passenger ships of the United Kingdom
Paddle steamers of the United Kingdom
Steamships of the United Kingdom
Ships built on the River Clyde
Transport in the Isles of Scilly